Les Bicots-nègres, vos voisins (Arabs and Niggers, Your Neighbours) is a 1974 French-Mauritanian film, written and directed by Med Hondo.

Les Bicots-nègres, vos voisins, a three-hour documentary, was Hondo's second feature-length film and his first colour feature. It opened with a 21-minute monologue in which a man, speaking directly to camera, expounded the history of cinematic representation in Africa. As in his debut film, Soleil O (1970), Hondo addressed the racism encountered by African immigrants in France, and the continuities between slavery and the postcolonial exploitation of migrant labour:

The film won the Gold Tanit at the 1974 Carthage Film Festival.

References

1974 films
French documentary films
Mauritanian documentary films
1974 documentary films
1970s French films